Karel Tammjärv (born 25 May 1989 in Tartu) is an Estonian cross-country skier who has competed since 2007. At the 2010 Winter Olympics in Vancouver, he finished 46th in the 30 km mixed pursuit and 67th in the 15 km events. He also represented Estonia at the 2014 Winter Olympics and 2018 Winter Olympics.

Tammjärv's best World Cup finish was 10th in a 4 x 7.5 km relay at France in 2016 while his best individual finish was 13th in a 15 km event at Switzerland in 2017.

In February 2019, he was arrested for allegations of blood doping and subsequently admitted to having doped since 2016.

References

External links

Biography at ESBL

1989 births
Cross-country skiers at the 2010 Winter Olympics
Cross-country skiers at the 2014 Winter Olympics
Cross-country skiers at the 2018 Winter Olympics
Estonian male cross-country skiers
Estonian sportspeople in doping cases
Tour de Ski skiers
Living people
Olympic cross-country skiers of Estonia
Sportspeople from Tartu
Doping cases in cross-country skiing
21st-century Estonian people